The 2017 Aegon Surbiton Trophy is a professional tennis tournament played on outdoor grass courts. It is the fourteenth edition of the tournament for the men and the fifteenth edition of the tournament for the women. It is part of the 2017 ATP Challenger Tour and the 2017 ITF Women's Circuit, offering a total prize money of €127,000 for men and $100,000 for women. It took place in Surbiton, United Kingdom, on 5–11 June 2017.

Men's singles main draw entrants

Seeds 

 1 Rankings as of 29 May 2017.

Other entrants 
The following players received wildcards into the singles main draw:
  Jay Clarke
  Dan Evans
  Cameron Norrie
  James Ward

The following players received entry into the singles main draw using protected rankings:
  Yuki Bhambri
  Matthew Ebden

The following player received entry into the singles main draw as an alternate:
  Malek Jaziri

The following players received entry from the qualifying draw:
  Dennis Novikov
  Roberto Quiroz
  Akira Santillan
  Denis Shapovalov

The following player received entry as a lucky loser:
  Andrew Whittington

Women's singles main draw entrants

Seeds 

 1 Rankings as of 29 May 2017.

Other entrants 
The following player received a wildcard into the singles main draw:
  Katie Boulter
  Harriet Dart
  Katy Dunne
  Gabriella Taylor

The following players received entry into the singles main draw using protected rankings:
  Zarina Diyas
  Jana Fett
  Magdaléna Rybáriková

The following players received entry from the qualifying draw:
  Paula Kania
  Danielle Lao
  Karolína Muchová
  Dayana Yastremska

Champions

Men's singles
 
 Yūichi Sugita def.  Jordan Thompson 7–6(9–7), 7–6(10–8).

Women's singles

 Magdaléna Rybáriková def.  Heather Watson, 6–4, 7–5

Men's doubles

 Marcus Daniell /  Aisam-ul-Haq Qureshi def.  Treat Huey /  Denis Kudla 6–3, 7–6(7–0).

Women's doubles

 Monique Adamczak /  Storm Sanders def.  Chang Kai-chen /  Marina Erakovic, 7–5, 6–4

External links 
 Aegon Surbiton Trophy at ITFtennis.com
 Official website

2017 ITF Women's Circuit
2017 ATP Challenger Tour
2017 in British sport
2017